J. Rupert Thompson (born July 14, 1964), is a director and producer of reality television.  His credits include Fear Factor, Wipeout, Kid Nation, American Gladiators, America's Next Top Model, and Estate of Panic. He is often credited for using intensive camera work in various formats of reality television, and utilizing a huge number of cameras.

Thompson won the Directors Guild of America Award 2005 as Best Director - Reality Programs for Outstanding Direction in a Reality Series for the premiere of Fear Factor, Season 6.

Thompson started his career as an electrician on horror films such as A Nightmare on Elm Street and The Blob.  He then became a freelance Director/Cameraman and shot segments for many clients, including the second season of MTV's The Real World based in Los Angeles.

Thompson was a partner at Evolution Film and Tape for ten years, from 1992 to 2002, where he created the popular children's television series Bug Juice with his partner Douglas Ross for Disney Channel.

Thompson currently resides in California with his wife Laura and son Cassiel.

References
 Variety Magazine

External links
  IMDB.com entry for J. Rupert Thompson
 DGA Awards Rupert for Reality TV Direction
 Variety Announces Winners of 2005 DGA Awards

American television directors
1964 births
Living people
Directors Guild of America Award winners